Enshi Tujia and Miao Autonomous Prefecture is located in the mountainous southwestern corner of Hubei province, People's Republic of China. It forms Hubei's southwestern "panhandle", bordering on Hunan  in the south and Chongqing Municipality in the west and northwest. The Yangtze River crosses the prefecture's northeastern corner in Badong County.

Administrative divisions 
There are two county-level cities:
 Enshi City, the prefectural seat
 Lichuan City

There are six counties:
 Xianfeng County
 Laifeng County
 Badong County
 Jianshi County
 Hefeng County
 Xuan'en County

History

Imperial
"Endless green mountains to walk on, endless clear water going away" 
(by a poet of the Tang dynasty)

Republican
Republic of China's Hubei provincial government was relocated to Enshi during the 1937-45 resistance war (against Japanese invasion and occupation).

The Roman Catholic Church had the Diocese of Shinan on the territory of today's Enshi Prefecture.

People's Republic of China
Badong County was the site of the Deng Yujiao incident.

Geography 

Enshi Prefecture is located in the west end of Hubei Province, a mountainous belt separating Hubei's Jianghan Plain from the Sichuan Basin.

There are karst phenomena in the region. The most famous of them is perhaps the Tenglong Cave near Lichuan, a county-level city of Enshi Tujia and Miao Autonomous Prefecture. A 290-meter deep karst sinkhole, located near the village of Luoquanyan in Xuan'en County, is described as possessing its own unique ecosystem.

The Enshi Grand Canyon is also a well-known scenic area.

Demographics
Enshi is the only autonomous prefecture in Hubei province.

Enshi is also the only part of Hubei which has been included in the Chinese government's Western exploration programme and over the next 5–10 years they will put 50 billion RMB into its development.

Transportation

The prefecture has only a small amount of Yangtze River frontage, but Badong, in the prefecture's northeast, has a Yangtze River port.

The Qing River in the central part of the prefecture, with its cascade of reservoirs, is an important waterway as well.

Due to the mountainous terrain, until recently the prefecture had no railways, and even the highways were of doubtful quality.

The Yichang−Wanzhou Railway, completed in December 2010, crosses the prefecture from east to west, providing a more direct connection between Hubei and Sichuan than was previously available. In addition, the Chongqing−Lichuan Railway from the Lichuan Railway Station on the Yiwan line connects the cities. A single line now connects Enshi with Beijing and Wuhan as well as many additional cities. The train between Beijing and Enshi takes approximately 24 hours and includes many stops along the way.

The G42 Shanghai–Chengdu Expressway, routed along the same Yichang-Wanzhou corridor, is under construction. The Sidu River Bridge on that road has become the world's highest bridge.

Xujiaping Airport is the only airport in Enshi.

Economy
The soil in Enshi is rich in selenium. Enshi is known as the "selenium capital of China" and is the world's sole independent selenium deposit. Selenium Square in the city is named after this rare element.

The countryside has a diverse range of flora and fauna, including many Chinese herbs. Much of the mountain landscape is covered in virgin forest and is home to pangolins.

Enshi locals are especially proud of their potato crops and consider the potato and tea crops to be the region's agricultural specialties.

Enshi Prefecture possesses significant hydroelectric resources. Among major hydroelectric dams already completed, or under construction, within the prefecture are:
 Shuibuya Dam, on the Qing River in Badong County — the tallest concrete face rock-fill dam in the world.
 Jiangpinghe Dam, on the Loushui River, near Jiangpingh Village, Zouma Town, Hefeng County.
 Dongping Dam, in Wanjia Township, Xuan'en County

References

External links

Official website of Enshi government

 
Prefecture-level divisions of Hubei
Miao autonomous prefectures
Tujia autonomous prefectures